Agyaat ( Anonymous) is a 2009 Indian Hindi-language mystery-adventure film directed by Ram Gopal Varma, starring Nithiin, Gautam Rode, Rasika Dugal, and Priyanka Kothari in the leading roles. The film was released on 7 August 2009. It was dubbed and released simultaneously in Telugu as Adavi. It's the remake of Hollywood movies predator. The film was shot mainly at Sigiriya jungle in Sri Lanka, with some scenes in the Athirappilly forests in Cochin, Kerala, India.

Synopsis
A film unit goes for a shoot in a forest but breaks down deep in the jungle. Resulting in a four-day delay, the 9-member cast and crew of a Bollywood movie, including leading lady Aasha, and her egotistical co-star, Sharman Kapoor; decide to relax and take an outing with their guide, Setu. They end up at a picturesque spot and decide to spend the night there not realizing they will soon be stalked and brutally killed by an invisible and unknown beast and/or an extraterrestrial entity.

Cast
Nitin Reddy as Sujal
Gautam Rode as Sharman Kapoor
Priyanka Kothari as Aasha
Ravi Kale as Rakka
Ishrat Ali as Moorthy
Howard Rosemeyer as JJ
Kali Prasad Mukherjee as Shekhar "Shaky"
Rasika Dugal as Sameera
Joy Fernandes as Sethu
Ishtiyak Khan as Laxman

Music

Reception
Rajeev Masand of CNN-IBN gave 3/5 (Watchable) for director Ramgopal Varma's Agyaat; Masand states "At a time when special effects and digital tricks can be used to create just about anything, here's a reminder that what really scares us is the stuff we can't see".

Nikhat Kazmi of Times of India gave 3/5 and noted "It neither thrills nor chills with its repetitive running-for-life sequences and its absolutely infuriating end which offers no explanation whatsoever for the scurrying and screaming".

Subhash K Jha (IBOS) gave 3.5/5 noting "Jungle fever has never been more contagious. Every corner of the Sri Lankan jungle as shot with mesmeric skill by the cinematographer Surjodeep Ghosh is filled with danger."

Taran Adarsh gave this movie a rating of 3.5/5 saying "Ramgopal Varma thinks differently. This time too, the maverick film-maker defies the stereotype and takes to the dense forests of Sri Lanka to meet an 'unknown' force" and explains further "But let's clear the misconception at the very start. Agyaat is no supernatural thriller (like Phoonk) or a horror fest (like Bhoot). This one's more of an adventure thriller that doesn't scare you at all, but makes you a participant in a pulse-pounding journey".

References

External links
 
 

Hindi-language horror films
2009 films
2000s Hindi-language films
Indian horror films
Films set in forests
Films directed by Ram Gopal Varma
UTV Motion Pictures films
2009 horror films